Foxton Fizz is the name of a soft drink produced in Foxton, New Zealand.

Background

The Foxton Fizz factory started up its machines in 1918, bringing their fizz to Foxton. Foxton Fizz is  years old and one of the last independent soft drink companies in New Zealand.

For an entire century, it has operated from the Foxton Fizz factory on 8 Whyte Street and delivered its fizz around New Zealand in its now iconic wooden crates. What started as a local drink soon became a familiar offering in lunch bars and hotels, and a staple at family gatherings and celebrations. The business began to decline after Coca-Cola began pushing their product into regional New Zealand. One initiative to try and counter the entry of Coca-Cola was offering a home drop service where customers would get a crate of bottles and then leave the empties out to be swapped for freshly-filled Foxton Fizz (similar to a milk delivery). However, the service ended following the advent of vending machines.

Starting as a family business, Foxton Fizz passed through several hands in the Perreau family. Foxton Fizz continued to thrive during tough market conditions, making small changes like using reusable glass bottles to replace soda siphons in 1955 and using recyclable cartons from 2008 onwards to become a more environmentally-friendly company. At the time of the ownership change in 2006 the company was still using the original machinery from 1918.

When Murray Perreau decided to close down the company, a group of friends from Wellington got together and bought Foxton Fizz.

Products
The fizz comes in multiple flavours, including Lime, Raspberry, Kola, Lemonade, Creaming Soda, and Cocktail. In mid-2020 the company started producing 1.5L bottle variants.

References

External links
Foxton  Fizz website
Close Up: Foxton Fizz (5:54), TVNZ, 24 July 2006

New Zealand drinks
Beverage companies of New Zealand
Foxton, New Zealand
Soft drinks